Playroom is a 1990 American horror film directed by Manny Coto in his directorial debut. The film stars Lisa Aliff, Aron Eisenberg, Christopher McDonald, and Vincent Schiavelli. The cinematographer was James L. Carter and the production designer was Vicky Jenson, who later went on to direct Shrek.

Plot
Chris (Christopher McDonald) is an archaeologist who has nightmares about the murder of his family, which occurred when he was a child, while the family was living in the ruins of a European monastery, while his father sought the tomb of Prince Elok, a ten year old prince who was obsessed with torture and worshiped a Slavic demon. Chris decides to return to the site and continue the search with his girlfriend Jenny (Lisa Aliff), a magazine editor who funds the effort in order to cover the story. Chris quickly begins to experience delusions such as the return of an imaginary friend from his childhood, Daniel (Aron Eisenberg).

In the meantime, the mental patient who had been wrongly accused of the murder of the family, Roman Hart (Vincent Schiavelli) also shows up in the town near the ruins, seeking revenge. Ultimately Chris recovers his memories of the murder of his family and discovers Prince Elok's chambers, causing the demonic Prince to reappear as a monster.

Cast
 Lisa Aliff as Jenny
 Aron Eisenberg as Daniel
 Christopher McDonald as Chris
 James Purcell as Paul
 Jamie Rose as Marcy
 Vincent Schiavelli as Roman Hart
 Kimberly Beck as Secretary

Release

The film was released on VHS by Republic Pictures on April 15, 1997.

References

External links
 
 
 
 

1990 films
1990 horror films
1990s monster movies
American monster movies
Films directed by Manny Coto
1990 directorial debut films
1990s English-language films
1980s English-language films
1990s American films